Le Banquet is a Canadian drama film from Quebec, directed by Sébastien Rose and released in 2008. The film's original working title was Comme une flamme.

Set at an unnamed university in Montreal amidst the backdrop of a student strike over rising tuition fees, the film centres on Bertrand (Alexis Martin), an idealistic young professor who battles the university administration after it refuses to expel a problem student (Benoît McGinnis) who is being disruptive in Bertrand's class.

The film's cast also includes Raymond Bouchard, Frédéric Pierre, Catherine De Léan, Pierre-Antoine Lasnier, Yves Jacques, Émile Proulx-Cloutier, Larissa Corriveau, Paul Savoie, Maxime Le Flaguais and Paul Ahmarani.

Cast 

 Larissa Corriveau as Karine
 Benoît McGinnis as Gilbert
 Frédéric Pierre as Louis-Ferdinand
 Raymond Bouchard as Jean-Marc - Recteur
 Alexis Martin as Bertrand
 Catherine De Léan as Natasha
 Émile Proulx-Cloutier as Stéphane
 Maxime Le Flaguais s Marcel
 Yves Jacques as Rivard
 Paul Ahmarani as Réalisateur

Award nominations
The film garnered five Genie Award nominations at the 29th Genie Awards in 2009:
Best Supporting Actor: McGinnis
Best Cinematography: Nicolas Bolduc
Best Overall Sound: Mario Auclair, Luc Boudrias and François Senneville
Best Editing: Dominique Fortin and Carina Baccanale
Best Sound Editing: François Senneville, Antoine Morin and Carole Gagnon
It did not win any of the awards.

It received three Jutra Award nominations at the 11th Jutra Awards, for Best Actor (Martin), Best Editing (Fortin, Baccanale) and Best Costume Design (Ginette Magny).

References

External links

2008 films
2008 drama films
Canadian drama films
Films set in Quebec
Films about school violence
Films directed by Sébastien Rose
French-language Canadian films
2000s Canadian films